This is a list of Clemson Tigers baseball seasons. The Clemson Tigers baseball program is a college baseball team that represents Clemson University in the Atlantic Division of the Atlantic Coast Conference in the National Collegiate Athletic Association. Clemson has played their home games at Doug Kingsmore Stadium in Clemson, South Carolina since 1970.  

The Tigers have won 15 conference championships, and have played in the NCAA Division I Baseball Championship 36 times, advancing to the College World Series on 12 occasions.  With 2,566 wins over 114 seasons of baseball, Clemson ranks 17th all-time in win–loss records and 8th in victories in the NCAA.

Season results

Notes

References
General

Specific

 
Clemson
Clemson Tigers baseball seasons